Frans Vanden Ouden (23 January 1904 – 20 November 1974) was a Belgian footballer. He played in one match for the Belgium national football team in 1925.

References

External links
 

1904 births
1974 deaths
Belgian footballers
Belgium international footballers
Place of birth missing
Association footballers not categorized by position